Robert James Gilks (July 2, 1864 in Cincinnati – August 21, 1944 in Brunswick, Georgia), was a Major League Baseball pitcher and outfielder from 1887 to 1893. He played for the Cleveland Blues, Cleveland Spiders, and Baltimore Orioles.

See also
 List of Major League Baseball annual saves leaders

External links

1864 births
1944 deaths
Major League Baseball pitchers
Major League Baseball left fielders
Baseball players from Cincinnati
19th-century baseball players
Cleveland Spiders players
Baltimore Orioles (NL) players
Minor league baseball managers
Gulfport-Biloxi Sand Crabs players
Hamilton (minor league baseball) players